Sharon Clark (born October 15, 1943, in Seminole, Oklahoma) is an American model and actress. She was Playboy Playmate of the Month for August 1970. Her centerfold was photographed by William Figge and Ed DeLong.

Career
In 1971, at age 27, she became the oldest Playmate of the Year, a record she held for 15 years, until Miss May 1985 Kathy Shower became PMOY 1986 at age 33.

Clark started appearing in films and on television in the late 1970s. She was also a Playboy Bunny at the St. Louis club.

Filmography
 The Uninvited (1996) (TV)
 Beyond Suspicion (1993) (TV) .... Waitress
 For the Very First Time (1991) (TV) .... Kathy
 Lisa (1990) .... Porsche Passenger
 The Long Journey Home (1987) (TV) .... Policewoman
 The Little Dragons (1980) (as Sharon Weber) .... Ruth Forbinger
 CHiPs - "The Strippers" (1980) (as Sharon Weber) .... Shari
 The Billion Dollar Hobo (1977) .... Jen
 Charlie's Angels - "The Las Vegas Connection" (1977) (as Sharon Weber) .... Leora
 Lifeguard (1976) (as Sharon Weber) .... Tina

See also
 List of people in Playboy 1970–79

References

External links
 

1943 births
Living people
People from Seminole, Oklahoma
American film actresses
1970s Playboy Playmates
Playboy Playmates of the Year
University of Oklahoma alumni
Peace Corps volunteers
20th-century American actresses
American television actresses
Actresses from Oklahoma
21st-century American women